Abu Tahir Yazid was sixth independent Shah of Shirvan and third Shah of Layzan. He was subjugated to Sajids and Sallarids. He fought against Derbent based Hashimids.

Family 
Abu Tahir Yazid had at least two sons:
 Muhammad (later known as Muhammed IV Shirvanshah) - he was given position of Layzanshah. He battled against emir of Derbend Abu al-Malik al-Hashimi in 930. 
 Ahmad - he was appointed as emir of Derbend after rebellion of local people against their liege. But was de-posted again by another rebellion. Executed by his brother in 948.

References

Sources
 

10th-century rulers in Asia